This is a list of animated cartoons that star Woody Woodpecker, who appeared in 203 cartoons (196 Woody shorts and 7 miscellaneous shorts) during and after the Golden age of American animation. All the cartoons were produced by Walter Lantz Productions, and were distributed by Universal Pictures, United Artists and Universal International. Also listed are miscellaneous cartoons that feature Woody but are not a part of the main short series, and the 2018 Woody Woodpecker web series.

1940s 
 = Academy Award nominee/winner

1940

1941

1942

1943

1944

1945

1946

1947

1948 
Starting this year until the studio's hiatus, all shorts are distributed by United Artists.

1949

1950s

1950 
Starting this year, all shorts are distributed by Universal International.

1951

1952

1953

1954

1955

1956

1957

1958

1959

1960s

1960

1961

1962

1963

1964

1965 
Starting this year, all shorts carry the "Universal Pictures" banner.
{| class="wikitable"
!style="width:3em"| #
!style="width:15em"| Title
!style="width:7em"| Date
!style="width:10em"| Director
! Notes
|-
| 139
| Three Little Woodpeckers
| January 2
| Sid Marcus
|
|-
| 140
| Woodpecker Wanted
| February 20
| Paul Smith
|
|-
| N/A
| Fractured Friendship
| March 20
| rowspan="2" | Sid Marcus
| Cameo in Chilly Willy short.
|-
| 141
| Birds of a Feather
| April 10
|
|-
| 142
| Canned Dog Feud
| June 19
| rowspan="2" | Paul Smith
|
|-
| 143
| Janie Get Your Gun
| August 7
|
|-
| 144
| Sioux Me
| September 25
| Sid Marcus
| Final appearance of Fink Fox.
|-
| 145
| What's Peckin'''
| December 4
| Paul Smith
|
|}

 1966 
Starting with Lonesome Ranger, all shorts are directed by Paul Smith.

 1967 

 1968 
{| class="wikitable"
!style="width:3em"| #
!style="width:15em"| Title
!style="width:7em"| Date
!style="width:10em"| Director
! Notes
|-
| 160
| Lotsa Luck| February 26
| rowspan="7" | Paul Smith
|
|-
| 161
| Woody the Freeloader| March 25
|
|-
| 162
| Peck of Trouble| April 22
|
|-
| 163
| Fat in the Saddle| May 20
|
|-
| 164
| Feudin Fightin-N-Fussin'| June 17
|
|-
| 165
| A Lad in Bagdad| August 5
|
|-
| 166
| One Horse Town| October 21
|
|}

 1969 

 1970s 
 1970 

 1971 

 1972 

 2018 

 References 

Tatay, Jack, Komorowski, Thad, Shakarian, Pietro, and Cooke, Jon. The Walter Lantz Cartune Encyclopedia''. Retrieved April 10, 2007.

Film series introduced in 1940
Woody Woodpecker theatrical cartoons, List of
Woody Woodpecker theatrical cartoons, list of
Woody Woodpecker